An electrical lighting technician, or simply lighting technician, are involved with rigging stage and location sets and controlling artificial, electric lights for art and entertainment venues (theatre or live music venues) or in video, television, or film production.

In a theater production, lighting technicians work under the lighting designer and master electrician. In video, television, and film productions, lighting technicians work under the direction of the gaffer or chief lighting technician who takes their direction from the cinematographer. In live music, lighting technicians work under the lighting director. All heads of department report to the production manager.

Lighting technicians are responsible for the movement and set up of various pieces of lighting equipment for separation of light and shadow or contrast, depth of field or visual effects. Lighting Technicians may also lay electrical cables, wire fixtures, install color effects or image patterns, focus the lights, and assist in creating effects or programming sequences.

A lighting technician's work concerns safety of rigging and working with objects which can be very heavy and get very hot.

Some local unions such as the International Alliance of Television Stage Employees (IATSE) Hollywood chapter local #728, have been qualifying members by certification and recognition through the Entertainment Stage Technologies Association (ESTA) with their Entertainment Technicians Certification Program (ETCP). Basic skill sets are now standardized, and sets and stage are safer through this program.

History
Officially called the electrical lighting technician, or the rigging electrical lighting technician, the technician is also known as set lighting technician, lamp operator, electrician, electric, spark or juicer.

The lighting technicians on a motion picture set handle all of the electrical needs as well as place and focus all of the lighting under the direction of the gaffer (chief lighting technician). 

Lighting techs also:

 Study the script and consult with director to assess what lighting is required (Gaffer).
 Discuss production requirements with the camera operator (Cinematographer).
 Select lights and equipment to be used and organize any additional equipment (Gaffer).
 Set up, focus and operate light fixtures and equipment.
 Control consoles and auxiliary equipment.
 Choose and combine colors to achieve the desired effect (Cinematographer/Gaffer).
 Operate the lights during the performance.
 Use manual or computer control consoles to control lighting throughout a production.
 Use devices such as barn-doors, scrims and other attachments to control lighted areas.
 Perform routine maintenance functions such as replacing lamps and damaged color filters or patterns and maintain lighting equipment in safe working conditions.
 Explore new techniques and special effects.
 Place and focus lighting fixtures for any given scene to be photographed.
 Distribute power and work lights around the set and support areas (including actor's trailers, portable production offices, catering, etc.).
 Management of electrical generators.
 Provide electricity to all support services and departments on the set.

Also, specialty roles are called upon the lighting technician such as:

 Follow spot operator
 Console/dimmer board operator
 Fixtures
 Manual/poor man's operator

Hours of work also vary. For example, those employed by large television productions generally work more than 40 hours a week, 60 hours or more are not uncommon. Technicians and other crew members typically work a 12-hour day.

Depending on script requirements, stage and locations bring on their own requirements for lighting and effects. Out of state, or country to get the right look in a script is not uncommon. Location work always brings on its own challenges. Weather is always a factor when going to a location. Technicians are like scouts and have to be prepared for all kinds of weather as per the season.

Working conditions for lighting technicians vary a great deal from one job to another. Lighting technicians generally spend a lot of time on their feet and the pace of work can become hectic. Last-minute changes are often required and safety precautions must be observed when handling hot lamps, climbing ladders or working on high voltage electrical cables and equipment. Lighting technicians are routinely required to lift and carry the heaviest and more dangerous equipment compared to the other departments and office staff.

The film set electrical department hierarchy is as follows: Electrical lighting techs (rigging electrical lighting techs) report to the Best Boy (Assistant Chief Lighting Technician or ACLT) who reports to the Gaffer (Chief Lighting Technician or CLT), who is the head of the department. The Rigging Best Boy (Rigging Assistant Chief Lighting Technician) reports to the Rigging Gaffer (Chief Rigging Technician) who is the head of the rigging, but not the department. Both rigging heads report to the ACLT and CLT of the department. The Gaffer is the Head of the Set Lighting Department and reports to the Director of Photography (Cinematographer) to make decisions on the creative lighting on the set (or on location), and is responsible for executing those decisions. A budget deciphered from the production schedule, script and vision mandates the types of lights and how to proceed with rigs.

In live music performances, concerts, and other entertainment, stage lighting technicians (also called a lighting tech, lighting operator, stage electrician, "sparky", "lampy", or "techie") set up lighting and make effects for live performances, concerts and any other show/production involving lighting. 

Duties include:
 Setting up and focusing lights
 Patching and or wiring up lights to dimmers or electronic control consoles
 Changing the set-up of lights during a performance or concert (e.g., changing color gels)
 Packing down lights after the show

The Stage lighting department hierarchy is as follows:

 Chief lighting Technician: works with the production manager to determine what effects need to be created, creates a plan to achieve the desired effects, and then directs the other members of the stage lighting department to set up the appropriate lighting equipment. This person can also be known as the House Electrician, Master Electrician or Venue Electrician.
 Lighting Board Programmer or Light board operator: Works with the chief lighting technician to program the lights using electronic or digital light programming equipment. The goal is to create light and color effects and sequences that enhance the onstage performance.
 Lighting Technician: sets up lights and wiring, and changes lights during a show, can also be called Stage Electrician.
 Stage lighting assistant: Works with the lighting technician to set up and patch or wire up lighting, also lugs gear to different areas of the stage area. These are sometimes utility technicians that may be shared between departments during a show day, depending on need and schedule.

See also
 Light board operator
 Television crew

References

External links 
Ald.org.uk, A comprehensive list of UK Lighting Designers
Danceusa.org, How to Work with a Lighting Designer
Stagelightingprimer.com,Stage Lighting for Students
Northern.edu, A brief history of stage lighting
The Lighting Archive Thelightingarchive.org, online complete lighting paperwork for West Side Story, Porgy and Bess, Sweeney Todd, Martha Graham, Alvin Ailey, by lighting designers Nicola Cernovich, Jean Rosenthal, Ken Billington, and Gilbert Helmsley
New York Public Library - Theatrical Lighting Database online complete lighting paperwork for Hair (musical) by Jules Fisher, A Chorus Line by Tharon Musser, Sunday in the Park with George by Richard Nelson, and Fall River Legend by Thomas Skelton.

Entertainment occupations
Filmmaking occupations
Film and video terminology
Road crew
Stage lighting
Technicians
Television terminology

de:Beleuchter
ja:照明技術者